Kärlekens decimaler is a 1960 Swedish drama film directed by Hasse Ekman.

Cast
Hasse Ekman as Charlie Gedelius
Eva Henning as Lena Lind
Stig Järrel as Nils Fähger
Eva Dahlbeck as Astrid, Charlies sister
Christina Schollin as Barbro "Barran" Bovell
Lennart Klefbom as Staffan Fähger
Siv Ericks as Lisa Bovell, Barrans mother  
Sigge Fürst as Malte Bovell, Barrans father
Åke Fridells as Edgar Temmelin
Asbjørn Andersen as Dr. Thiess 
Renée Björling as Mrs. Lind, Lenas mother
Margareta Blytgen as Petersen, a housekeeper

External links

1960 films
Films directed by Hasse Ekman
Swedish drama films
1960s Swedish-language films
1960s Swedish films